Coffman Cove Seaplane Base  is a state-owned public-use seaplane base in Coffman Cove, a city in the Prince of Wales-Hyder Census Area on Prince of Wales Island in the U.S. state of Alaska. It is included in the National Plan of Integrated Airport Systems for 2011–2015, which categorized it as a general aviation facility.

Facilities and aircraft
Coffman Cove Seaplane Base has one seaplane landing area designated N/S, which measures . For the 12-month period ending December 31, 2006, the airport had 475 aircraft operations, an average of 39 per month: 84% air taxi and 16% general aviation.

Airlines and destinations

Statistics

References

External links
 Topographic map from USGS The National Map

Airports in the Prince of Wales–Hyder Census Area, Alaska
Seaplane bases in Alaska